USCGC Spencer (WPG-36) was a Treasury-class cutter of the United States Coast Guard that served during World War II.  She was named for U.S. Treasury Secretary John Canfield Spencer.

Early career and World War II

Commissioned in 1937, she was first used as a search and rescue unit off Alaska's fishing grounds. When the United States entered World War II, the Coast Guard temporarily became part of the United States Navy. Spencer saw service in the Pacific War. During the Battle of Atlantic, she acted as a convoy escort, hunting German U-boats, and was responsible for sinking U-633 and U-175 in 1943.

Convoys escorted

Spencer was assigned to the US Navy's Seventh Fleet, in the Pacific in late 1944, where she served as a Communications Command Ship. There she was credited with taking part in numerous amphibious assaults including Luzon and Palawan in the Philippines Campaign.

Post-war career
After the war, Spencer returned to her Coast Guard duties, serving in the Atlantic Ocean. Here she provided navigational assistance for the fledgling Trans-Atlantic air industry and acted as a search and rescue platform for both ships and aeroplanes.

She returned to combat duty off the Vietnam coast in February 1969. For ten months, she carried out surveillance to prevent troops and supplies from getting into South Vietnam.  She detected over 4,200 suspicious vessels and craft, closely monitored the movement of more than 1,320 of them and boarded 27 vessels to inspect of both their cargo and crew.  Spencer detained 52 "enemy suspects" and turned them over to the South Vietnamese military for questioning.  She also executed 13 naval gunfire missions in support of operations on land, destroying or damaging over 160 enemy structures, bunkers, and base camps.  Spencer left Vietnam at the end of September and returned to the United States.

For the next five years, Spencer continued her peace-time mission of ocean station keeping.

Retirement
Spencer served for over 37 years and when decommissioned in 1974, she was the most decorated cutter in the Coast Guard's fleet. Her last voyage was from New York City to the United States Coast Guard Yard, Curtis Bay on 15 January 1974. On board her for this voyage were 24 of her World War II crew. She was decommissioned on 23 January 1974.

She served as an engineering training ship with students using her steam propulsion plant until 15 December 1980. She was then sold to the North American Smelting Company and scrapped.

Awards
 
 Presidential Unit Citation
 China Service Medal
 American Defense Service Medal
 American Campaign Medal
 European-African-Middle Eastern Campaign Medal with five battle stars
 Asiatic-Pacific Campaign Medal with four battle stars
 World War II Victory Medal
 Navy Occupation Medal with "ASIA" clasp
 National Defense Service Medal with one service star
 Vietnam Service Medal with three campaign stars
 Philippine Presidential Unit Citation
 Philippine Liberation Medal
 Republic of Vietnam Meritorious Unit Citation with Gallantry Cross with Palm
 Republic of Vietnam Campaign Medal

References

Treasury-class cutters
1937 ships
Ships of the United States Coast Guard
Ships built in Brooklyn